Nelson East is an inner suburb of Nelson, New Zealand. As its name suggests, it lies to the east of Nelson city centre, along the banks of the Maitai River between the city centre and Maitai. Notable features of Nelson East include Queen's Gardens and the Nelson Marlborough Institute of Technology.

Education

References

Suburbs of Nelson, New Zealand
Populated places in the Nelson Region